Blue Mountains may refer to:

Geography
Blue Mountains (New South Wales), Australia
City of Blue Mountains, a local government area west of Sydney
Blue Mountains Conservation Society, NGO advocating for the protection of the Blue Mountains in NSW
Blue Mountains Line, a railway line
Blue Mountains National Park
Blue Mountains walking tracks
Electoral district of Blue Mountains
Greater Blue Mountains Area, a World Heritage Site
Blue Mountains (Nunavut), Canada
The Blue Mountains, Ontario, a town in Canada
Blue Mountains (Congo), northwest of Lake Albert, Democratic Republic of the Congo
Sinimäed Hills (Blue Mountains) in Estonia, near Narva
Nilgiri mountains (Blue Mountains), southern India
Blue Mountains (Jamaica) 
Blue Mountains (New Zealand), in West Otago
Blue Mountains (Niger), a mountain range near the Aïr Mountains in Niger
Blue Mountains (Pacific Northwest), United States
Blue Mountains (ecoregion), a Level III ecoregion
Blue Mountains or Abajo Mountains, Utah, United States

Fictional
The Blue Mountains (Elgar), a song about Australia by Sir Edward Elgar to a poem by Alfred Noyes
The Blue Mountains (fairy tale), a fairy tale by Andrew Lang in The Yellow Fairy Book
Blue Mountains (Middle-earth) or Ered Luin, fictional mountains in Tolkien's Middle-earth

Other uses
 Blue Mountains (1983 film),  Georgian film of Eldar Shengelaia
 Blue Mountains (2015 film),  Hindi film of Raujesh Kumar Jain
 "Blue Mountains" (Bluey), an episode of the first season of the animated TV series Bluey

See also
 List of Blue Mountains subjects, articles about the Blue Mountains in Australia
 Blue Mountain (disambiguation)
 Blue Ridge Mountains
 Blue Ridge (disambiguation)